Qingzhou (青州乡) is a township in Jiajiang County, Sichuan, China.

See also 
 List of township-level divisions of Sichuan

References 

Township-level divisions of Sichuan
Jiajiang County